Vakhtang "Vakho" Butskhrikidze (Georgian: ვახტანგ [ვახო] ბუცხრიკიძე) (born September 28, 1970) is a Georgian economist, businessman and CEO of TBC Bank. He joined the bank in  1993 was appointed to the position of Chief Executive Officer (CEO) of TBC in 1995, and has remained in that position since his appointment.

Early life and education
Butskhrikidze was born in Tbilisi, Georgian SSR, Soviet Union in 1970. He graduated from Tbilisi State University in 1992 with a degree in Economics and holds post graduate qualifications from the Institute of Economics, Academy of Sciences of Georgia. Vakhtang obtained an MBA from the European School of Management in Tbilisi in 2001.

Career
Vakhtang Butskhrikidze is a banker. Vakhtang joined TBC Bank as a Senior Manager of the Credit Department in 1993 and was elected as Deputy Chairman of the Management Board in 1994. He became Chairman of the Management Board in 1996. Since 1998, he has held the position of CEO of TBC Bank and has headed a number of TBC's committees. Vakhtang is also a member of the Supervisory Boards of the Association of Banks of Georgia and is Chairman of the Financial Committee of the Business Association of Georgia. Since 2011 he has also held the position of member of the Supervisory Board of the Partnership Fund, Georgia. In 2016, Vakhtang joined the Visa Central & Eastern Europe, Middle East and Africa (CEMEA) Business Council. In his earlier career, Vakhtang acted as Junior Specialist at the Institute of Economics, Academy of Sciences of Georgia, as well as an Assistant to the Minister of Finance of Georgia between 1992 and 1993.

References

1970 births
Living people
Tbilisi State University alumni
Georgian bankers